Kostenki or Kostyonki may refer to:
Kostenki, Kirov Oblast, a village in Murashinsky District of Kirov Oblast
Kostenki, Smolensk Oblast, a village in Safonovsky District of Smolensk Oblast
Kostyonki, Voronezh Oblast, a selo in Khokholsky District of Voronezh Oblast
Kostyonki (palaeolithic site)